Leccinellum is a genus of fungi in the family Boletaceae. Mycologists Andreas Bresinsky and Manfred Binder circumscribed the genus in 2003 to contain Leccinum species with a yellow pore surface and a trichoderm-like cap cuticle. Leccinellum nigrescens (originally Leccinum nigrescens Singer 1947) was designated the type species; this taxon has since been renamed to Leccinellum crocipodium (Letell.) Della Maggiora & Trassinelli.

The oak-associating Leccinellum quercophilum was described from the United States in 2013.

References

Boletaceae
Boletales genera